Üçoluk  (literally "three ditches") is a  village in Gülnar district of Mersin Province, Turkey. The population of the village was 399  as of 2012. The main economic activity is agriculture.

References

Villages in Gülnar District